Henri Beaulieu (1873 in Montargis – 1953) was a French stage and film actor, theatre managing director and author.

Filmography 
 1927 : Napoléon by Abel Gance
 1934: Vers l'abîme
 1934 : Primerose by René Guissart
 1936 : The Green Domino
 1936 : Passé à vendre
 1936 : Le Collier du grand duc
 1938 : The Novel of Werther by Max Ophüls
 1938 : The Little Thing
 1939 : The Mondesir Heir by Albert Valentin
 1950 : De Mayerling à Sarajevo by Max Ophüls

Bibliography 
 1905 : Les théâtres du boulevard du Crime, Ed. H. Daragon
 La mise en scène et l'interprétation du répertoire classique, Revue d'art dramatique, 1906

References

External links 
 

French male film actors
People from Montargis
1873 births
1953 deaths